Nattapong Kesapan (RTGS: Nattapong Kesapan, born July 25, 1987) is a member of the Thailand men's national volleyball team.

Personal life
Nattapong Kesapan married with Wilavan Apinyapong, at Kham Sakaesaeng, Nakhon Ratchasima on 7 May 2017.

Clubs
  Krungkao Air Force (2012–2014)
  Nakhon Ratchasima (2014–2015)
  Chonburi E-Tech Air Force (2015–2016)

Awards

Individual 
 2013-14 Men's Volleyball Thailand League "Best Setter"

Clubs 
 2014–15 Thailand League -  Champion, with Nakhon Ratchasima
 2015–16 Thailand League -  3rd place, with Chonburi E-Tech Air Force
 2016–17 Thailand League -  Champion, with Air Force

References 

1989 births
Living people
Nattapong Kesapan
Nattapong Kesapan
Southeast Asian Games medalists in volleyball
Competitors at the 2009 Southeast Asian Games
Nattapong Kesapan